The 2012 Vietnam Open Grand Prix was the ninth grand prix gold and grand prix tournament of the 2012 BWF Grand Prix Gold and Grand Prix. The tournament was held in Phan Dinh Phung Stadium, Ho Chi Minh City, Vietnam from August 20 until August 26, 2012 and had a total purse of $50,000.

Men's singles

Seeds

  Nguyen Tien Minh (champion)
  Dionysius Hayom Rumbaka (semi-final)
  Ajay Jayaram (second round)
  Alamsyah Yunus (quarter-final)
  Sony Dwi Kuncoro (semi-final)
  Takuma Ueda (final)
  Sourabh Varma (third round)
  Chou Tien-chen (quarter-final)
  Tanongsak Saensomboonsuk (first round)
  Rajah Menuri Venkata Gurusaidutt (first round)
  Chan Yan Kit (third round)
  Mohd Arif Abdul Latif (third round)
  Anand Pawar (first round)
  Suppanyu Avihingsanon (first round)
  Derek Wong Zi Liang (first round)
  Ashton Chen Yong Zhao (third round)

Finals

Top half

Section 1

Section 2

Section 3

Section 4

Bottom half

Section 5

Section 6

Section 7

Section 8

Women's singles

Seeds

  Porntip Buranaprasertsuk (champion)
  Eriko Hirose (quarter-final)
  Fu Mingtian (first round)
  Sapsiree Taerattanachai (semi-final)
  Xing Aiying (first round)
  Maria Febe Kusumastuti (second round)
  Bellaetrix Manuputty (quarter-final)
  Aprilia Yuswandari (quarter-final)

Finals

Top half

Section 1

Section 2

Bottom half

Section 3

Section 4

Men's doubles

Seeds

  Kim Ki-jung / Kim Sa-rang (semi-final)
  Bodin Issara / Maneepong Jongjit (champion)
  Mohd Zakry Abdul Latif / Mohd Fairuzizuan Mohd Tazari (first round)
  Ricky Karanda Suwardi / Muhammad Ulinnuha (semi-final)
  Alvent Yulianto / Markis Kido (quarter-final)
  Hoon Thien How / Tan Wee Kiong (quarter-final)
  Markus Fernaldi Gideon / Agripinna Prima Rahmanto Putra (quarter-final)
  Gan Teik Chai / Ong Soon Hock (first round)

Finals

Top half

Section 1

Section 2

Bottom half

Section 3

Section 4

Women's doubles

Seeds

  Shizuka Matsuo / Mami Naito (second round)
  Eom Hye-won / Jang Ye-na (withdrew)
  Vivian Hoo Kah Mun / Woon Khe Wei (quarter-final)
  Ng Hui Ern / Ng Hui Lin (final)
  Rie Eto / Yu Wakita (quarter-final)
  Pia Zebadiah / Rizki Amelia Pradipta (champion)
  Suci Rizki Andini / Della Destiara Haris (second round)
  Chien Yu-chin / Wu Ti-jung (semi-final)

Finals

Top half

Section 1

Section 2

Bottom half

Section 3

Section 4

Mixed doubles

Seeds

  Maneepong Jongjit / Savitree Amitrapai (withdrew)
  Danny Bawa Chrisnanta / Vanessa Neo Yu Yan (first round)
  Fran Kurniawan / Shendy Puspa Irawati (semi-final)
  Irfan Fadhilah / Weni Anggraini (first round)
  Thitipong Lapoe / Peeraya Munkitamorn (quarter-final)
  Tan Aik Quan / Lai Pei Jing (final)
  Riky Widianto / Richi Puspita Dili (quarter-final)
  Kim Sa-rang / Choi Hye-in (first round)

Finals

Top half

Section 1

Section 2

Bottom half

Section 3

Section 4

References

Vietnam Open
Vietnam Open (badminton)
2012 Vietnam Open
21st century in Ho Chi Minh City
2012 in Vietnamese sport